Zimbabwe competed at the 2015 World Aquatics Championships in Kazan, Russia from 24 July to 9 August.

Swimming

Zimbabwean swimmers achieved qualifying standards in the following events (up to a maximum of 2 swimmers in each event at the A-standard entry time, and 1 at the B-standard):

Men

Women

References

External links
 Zimbabwe Aquatics Union

Nations at the 2015 World Aquatics Championships
2015
World Aquatics Championships